Olympic Sports Center  may refer to:

 Olympic Sports Centre (Beijing)
 Chongqing Olympic Sports Center
 Jinan Olympic Sports Center 
 Nanjing Olympic Sports Center
 Nanjing Olympic Sports Center Gymnasium
 Olympic Sports Centre, Riga
 Shenyang Olympic Sports Center Stadium

See also
Olympic Sports Center station (disambiguation)